Abdullahi Mohamed Nor is a Somali politician who is a Member of the House of the People, the lower house of the Federal Parliament of Somalia, representing Hirshabelle. He is the current minister of internal security for the federal republic of Somalia and former State Minister for Finance.

References

Year of birth missing (living people)
Living people
Somalian politicians